CNH may refer to:

 California-Nevada-Hawaii District Key Club International, a governing body of Key Club International
 Claremont Municipal Airport in Claremont, New Hampshire, United States
 CNH Industrial, an agriculture and construction equipment company 
 CNH Global, a subsidiary of CNH Industrial
 Carteira Nacional de Habilitação, the Driving licence in Brazil
 Currency code for Offshore renminbi
 The ISO 639-3 code for the Hakha Chin language
 Consejo Nacional de Huelga, "National Strike Council", an organization for human rights founded in Mexico, 1968
 Comisión Nacional de Hidrocarburos (Mexico), the National Hydrocarbons Commission
 Central neurogenic hyperventilation in medicine